Raby Mere is a hamlet on the Wirral Peninsula, England.  Adjacent to the Green Belt, woodland and open countryside, it is known for its mere, a lake that has been used for leisure purposes for many years.  The hamlet of Raby is located two miles to the west.

Since local government reorganisation on 1 April 1974, Raby Mere has been situated administratively within the Metropolitan Borough of Wirral.  It is in the Clatterbridge Ward in the parliamentary constituency of Wirral South.  At the time of the 2011 Census, Raby Mere, with its small residential area of exclusively detached homes, had a total population of 750.

Geography

Community
The parish churches are All Saints Church, Thornton Hough and St George's Church, Thornton Hough.  The local primary school is Thornton Hough Primary.

Transport

Road
The M53 motorway runs along the western side of Raby Mere.

Bus
The hamlet is served by the Number 84 bus that runs Mondays to Saturdays every 2 hours during the day from     Heswall to Raby Mere via Clatterbridge, Spital and Bromborough run by Avon Buses.

References

External links

Towns and villages in the Metropolitan Borough of Wirral